Alexandru Colorian (March 18, 1896–October 1971) was a Romanian poet.

He was a native of Bucharest and a graduate of the University of Bucharest's law faculty. Colorian had made his literary debut in 1913, while still in high school, in Sărbătoarea eroilor magazine, which he edited with several classmates under the guidance of Eugeniu Sperantia. From 1924 to 1929, he edited Îndreptarea newspaper. Among the magazines that published his work were Versuri și proză, Vieața Nouă, Universul literar, Tribuna avocaților, Lumea militară and Decalog. In 1968, he published an anthology of Vieața Nouă poets. He was responsible for several editions of Mihai Eminescu's work (Poezii, 1940; Poezii postume, with Al. Iacobescu, 1940; Proză literară, 1943), which he accompanied with introductory studies. His short collections of verse included Simple fantezii pentru toamnă (1926), Preludii în zori (1928), 1917. Poeme de război (1936), Inscripții pentru Balcic (1937), Exil (1938) and Stampe italice (1939).

Bibliography

Simple fantezii pentru toamnă, Bucharest, 1926
Preludii în zori, Bucharest, 1928
1917. Poeme de război, Bucharest, 1936
Inscripţii pentru Balcic, Bucharest, 1937
Exil, Bucharest, 1938
Stampe italice, Bucharest, 1939
Poema eternă, Bucharest, 1941
Poeme alese, Bucharest, 1942
Poeme. Medalioane lirice, Bucharest, 1968

Notes

1896 births
1971 deaths
20th-century Romanian poets
Romanian male poets
Symbolist poets
Romanian magazine editors
Romanian newspaper editors
Romanian anthologists
Romanian literary historians
20th-century Romanian historians
Writers from Bucharest
University of Bucharest alumni
20th-century Romanian male writers